Vila is a genus of nymphalid butterfly found in northern South America.

Species
Listed alphabetically:
Vila azeca (Doubleday, [1848])
Vila emilia (Cramer, [1779])
Vila eueidiformis Joicey & Talbot, 1918

References

Biblidinae
Nymphalidae of South America
Nymphalidae genera
Taxa named by William Forsell Kirby